This is the electoral history of Andrew Cuomo, who served as the 56th Governor of New York from 2011 to 2021, as the 64th Attorney General of New York from 2007 to 2010 and as the 11th United States Secretary of Housing and Urban Development from 1997 to 2001. He is the son of Mario Cuomo, the 52nd Governor of New York.

New York Attorney General elections

2006

New York gubernatorial elections

2002

2010

2014

2018

2022

On May 28, 2019, Cuomo announced that he would seek re-election to a fourth term in 2022. However, On August 10, 2021, Cuomo resigned from office due to allegations of sexual harassment.

References

Andrew Cuomo
Cuomo, Andrew